Enrico Pfister (born 4 April 1982) is an Austrian football player currently playing for SC Rheindorf Altach.

References

1984 births
Living people
Austrian footballers

Association football defenders
SC Rheindorf Altach players